Javier Henares Payo (born 17 January 1985) is a Spanish professional footballer who plays for Juventud de Torremolinos CF as a forward.

Career
Born in Málaga, Andalusia, Henares made his senior debut with CD Alhaurino in 2004, in Tercera División. After representing Atlético Malagueño and Albacete Balompié B, he moved to Scotland with Hamilton Academical in 2006.

Henares made his professional debut on 5 August 2006, coming on as a second-half substitute for Richard Offiong in a 6–0 First Division away loss against Gretna. He scored his first goal for the club ten days later, netting his side's second in a 3–1 home win against Berwick Rangers for the League Cup.

In October 2006, Henares was loaned to Second Division side Alloa Athletic until January. He made his debut for the club on 21 October, scoring the winner in a 2–1 away success over Peterhead.

In January 2007, Henares returned to his home country after agreeing to a contract with Antequera CF in the fourth level. He subsequently represented Jerez CF, Arcos CF, CD Alhaurino (two stints), UD Los Barrios and Marbella FC in the same category before moving to Switzerland with Yverdon-Sport FC.

On 23 January 2014, after stints at FC Serrières and FC Stade Nyonnais, Henares signed for UCAM Murcia CF in the fourth division. He would resume his career in the lower leagues in the following years, representing Antequera, CD El Palo, Alhaurín de la Torre CF, CD Zenit de Torremolinos and CD Ciudad de Lucena.

References

External links

1985 births
Living people
Footballers from Málaga
Spanish footballers
Association football forwards
Tercera División players
Atlético Malagueño players
Atlético Albacete players
Antequera CF footballers
UD Los Barrios footballers
Marbella FC players
UCAM Murcia CF players
Scottish Football League players
Hamilton Academical F.C. players
Alloa Athletic F.C. players
Yverdon-Sport FC players
FC Serrières players
FC Stade Nyonnais players
Spanish expatriate footballers
Spanish expatriate sportspeople in Scotland
Spanish expatriate sportspeople in Switzerland
Expatriate footballers in Scotland
Expatriate footballers in Switzerland